The Romance of Kenny G is the fourth compilation album by saxophonist Kenny G. It was released by Arista Records in 2004.

Track listing
"Everlasting"
"Going Home"
"Forever in Love"
"Silhouette"
"Northern Lights"
"Gettin' on the Step"
"The Look of Love"
"Moonlight"
"My Heart Will Go On"
"Songbird"
"The Moment"
"Peace"

References

External links
 

Kenny G compilation albums
Green Hill Productions albums
2004 compilation albums
Arista Records compilation albums